David Chemweno (born 18 December 1981) is a Kenyan long-distance runner who specializes in the 3000 metres steeplechase. He was the gold medallist in that event at the 2004 African Championships in Athletics.

International competitions

Personal bests
3000 metres - 7:41.35 min (2005)
3000 metres steeplechase - 8:09.09 min (2005)

References

External links
 

1981 births
Living people
Kenyan male long-distance runners
Kenyan male steeplechase runners
Place of birth missing (living people)